Yuzhny is the southern island of the Novaya Zemlya archipelago, lying north of Russia. It is separated from Severny Island by the narrow Matochkin Strait, which is covered with ice most of the year. West of Yuzhny Island lies the Barents Sea, and to the east the Kara Sea.

History
Originally home to the Nenets people, the island was largely evacuated in the 1950s to make way for nuclear weapons testing.

Ecology
Yuzhny Island is known for its large seabird population. The island's vegetation largely consists of tundra.

See also
 List of islands of Russia

References

External links
 Location
 Nature Reserve

Islands of Novaya Zemlya
Islands of Arkhangelsk Oblast
Islands of the Kara Sea
Islands of the Barents Sea